Chinese Volleyball Super League, often abbreviated to CVL (abbreviation remain unchanged), are the pre-eminent men's and women's professional volleyball leagues in China. It was founded in 1996 as the Chinese Volleyball League and is organized by the Chinese Volleyball Association (CVA), operating with China National Sports Group (CNSG). The league was rebranded to the Chinese Volleyball Super League when it became fully professional in 2017. The champions qualify for the Asian Men's and Women's Club Volleyball Championships.

The women's league normally starts in November and ends in March of the following year, while the men's league starts in October and ends in February of the following year, lasting for about four months. The league is divided into four stages: the first two stages normally called the "Regular Season", and the last two stages called the "Playoffs".

The number of teams has increased from 12 to 14 since the 2017/18 season, for both men's and women's leagues.

Due to Covid-19, Season 2020/21 & 2021/22 shorten the competition to about 2 months, and held at a designated venue.

Format (Former)
First stage
14 team divided into 2 groups (Group A and Group B), each group has a designated venue, 6 rounds of matches are scheduled and finish in a week. Each team play 6 matches in this stage. The top four teams of each group enter the Final 8 at second stage. The points will not bring into the second stage.

Second stage
The top 8 teams in Group A and Group B plays 7 home matches and 7 away matches (total 14 rounds) in this stage, to determine the rankings of 1–4 in the second stage and the final position in the 5–8th of the league. The bottom 6 teams in Group A and Group B plays 6 home matches and 4 away matches (total 10 rounds) in this stage, to determine the final ranking of 9–14th of the league. The duration last for two months.

Third stage
The top 4 teams (Final 4), in accordance with the second stage, rank 1 against rank 4, rank 2 against rank 3, using five games three wins. The team followed by a home game, two guest games, two home games.

Fourth stage
1) The losers of third stage plays for the third or fourth place of the league and use three games and two wins.

2) The winners of third stage plays for the champion matches of the league and use five games and three wins.

Men's Super League

Current clubs (14 teams)

Teams in the Chinese Volleyball Super League (2022–2023)

Results of Previous Seasons

Most Valuable Player (MVP) by edition
2014–2015 – 
2015–2016 – 
2016–2017 – 
2017–2018 – 
2022–2023 –

Titles by clubs

Women's Super League

Current clubs (14 teams)

Teams in the Chinese Volleyball Super League (2022–2023)

Results of Previous Seasons

Most Valuable Player (MVP) by edition
1996-1997 – 
1997-1998 – 
1998–1999 – 
1999–2000 – vacant
2000–2001 –       
2001–2002 – 
2002–2003 – 
2003–2004 – 
2004–2005 – 
2005–2006 – 
2006–2007 – 
2007–2008 – 
2008–2009 – 
2009–2010 – 
2010–2011 – 
2011–2012 – 
2012–2013 – 
2013–2014 – 
2014–2015 – 
2015–2016 – 
2016–2017 – 
2017–2018 – 
2018–2019 – vacant
2019–2020 – 
2020–2021 – 
2021–2022 – 
2022–2023 –

Titles by clubs

Official sponsorship

Performance in Asian Club Championship

Men
Asian Men's Club Volleyball Championship

Women
Asian Women's Club Volleyball Championship

Performance in FIVB World Club Championship

Men
FIVB Volleyball Men's Club World Championship

Women
FIVB Volleyball Women's Club World Championship

See also
List of Chinese volleyball players

References

External links
Official website of the Chinese Volleyball Association
  Chinese League. women.volleybox.net 

League
China
Sports leagues in China
Sports leagues established in 1996
1996 establishments in China
Professional sports leagues in China